Moez Kassam (born August 27, 1980 Toronto, Ontario) is a Canadian alternative asset manager. He is a founder and principal of Anson Funds, which manages a collection of long-short equity funds - most notably, Anson Investments Master Fund LP (AIMF). Anson Group was founded in 2007. Kassam also received the 2018 Canada's 40 under 40 award. He is a member of the board of directors for the Canadian Olympic Committee foundation.

Education
Kassam started school at Bayview Glen School in 1994. His interest in financial markets began after his class placed in the top three schools in the TD Stock Portfolio Challenge (within Ontario). He subsequently attended the University of Western Ontario, graduating in 2002 with a Bachelor of Arts. In 2010, Kassam received an MBA in finance from the London Business School, a constituent college of the University of London.

Career
In 2007, Kassam founded Anson Funds, an alternative asset management company that focuses on three core strategies: classic shorts, value longs and opportunistic investments. Anson Group now operates several investment funds including Anson Investments Master Fund (AIMF) and Anson Catalyst Fund. He is the primary Portfolio Manager of Anson Investments Management Fund (AIMF), the flagship fund out of a collection of funds managed by Anson Funds. In 2021, Anson Funds posted impressive returns on the back of the meme stock frenzy

Personal life
Moez married Marissa Siegal in 2016, and together they collectively founded the "Moez & Marissa Kassam Foundation" in 2016 as well.

Legal controversy
In March 2022, Bloomberg reported that Anson Funds and Moez Kassam has been the subject of a probe by the Department of Justice and received direct subpoenaes examining tactics used by Anson in short selling.

Philanthropy
He sits on the board of the Young Presidents Organization (YPO), and Toronto Public Library Foundation. In June 2020, Kassam joined the board of directors for the Canadian Olympic Committee foundation. He is also the Fundraising Lead for the Ryerson University Lifeline Syria Challenge (RULSC). In March 2021, Moez contributed $1M to Michael Garron Hospital in Toronto. In May 2022, Moez and Marissa Kassam also donated to the Sinai Health Foundation

Kassam has donated to the University of Toronto, which allowed him to invite Abdulaziz Sachedina to join Emmanuel College at the University of Toronto as a distinguished visiting professor of Islamic Studies.

References

External links
 Official website
 Anson Group

1980 births
Living people
21st-century American businesspeople
Businesspeople from Toronto
Canadian financial analysts
Canadian financial company founders
Canadian financiers
Canadian hedge fund managers
Canadian investors
Canadian money managers
Canadian philanthropists
Canadian stock traders
Stock and commodity market managers
University of Western Ontario alumni